Miss America 1956, the 29th Miss America pageant, was held at the Boardwalk Hall in Atlantic City, New Jersey on September 10, 1955 and was broadcast of the competition on ABC.

Sharon Ritchie became the first Miss Colorado to be the winner. As she was crowned, master of ceremonies Bert Parks performed the song "There She Is..." for the first time.

Results

Awards

Preliminary awards

Other awards

Contestants

References

External links
 Miss America official website

1956
1955 in the United States
1956 beauty pageants
1955 in New Jersey
September 1955 events in the United States
Events in Atlantic City, New Jersey